Tmesisternus jaspideus is a species of beetle in the family Cerambycidae. It was described by Jean Baptiste Boisduval in 1835.

Subspecies
 Tmesisternus sulcatipennis Blanchard, 1853
 Tmesisternus flexiosa Pascoe, 1867

References

jaspideus
Beetles described in 1835